Theresia Josefine "Therese" Rampl (14 January 1906 – 19 July 1969) was an Austrian diver. She competed in the women's 10 metre platform event at the 1936 Summer Olympics.

References

External links
 

1906 births
1969 deaths
Austrian female divers
Olympic divers of Austria
Divers at the 1936 Summer Olympics